The Ambassador from New Zealand to the Netherlands is New Zealand's foremost diplomatic representative in the Kingdom of the Netherlands, and in charge of New Zealand's diplomatic mission in the Netherlands.

The embassy is located in The Hague.  New Zealand has maintained a resident ambassador in the Netherlands since 1967, and a resident Head of Mission since 1950.  The Ambassador to the Netherlands is concurrently accredited to Denmark, Finland, Iceland, Norway and Sweden.

List of heads of mission

Consuls to the Netherlands
 J V Brennan (1950–1952)
 C F Shapcott (1952–1957)
 T A N Johnson (1957–1961)
 Jim Hale (1961–1965)

Ambassadors to the Netherlands

Non-resident ambassadors, resident in France
 Dick Hutchens (1965–1967)

Resident ambassadors
 Rex Cunninghame (1967–1972)
 Vince Roberts (1972–1977)
 Gray Thorp (1977–1982)
 Basil Bolt (1982–1988)
 Ken Cunningham (1988–1991)
 Graeme Ammundsen (1991–1995)
 Hilary Willberg (1995–1998)
 Chris Butler (1998–2002)
 David Payton (2002–2006)
 Rachel Fry (2006-2010)
 George Troup (2010-2014)
 Janet Lowe (diplomat) (2014-2017)
 Lyndal Walker (2017-)

See also
 Netherlands–New Zealand relations

References
 New Zealand Heads of Overseas Missions: the Netherlands.  New Zealand Ministry of Foreign Affairs and Trade.  Retrieved on 2008-03-29.

Netherlands, Ambassadors from New Zealand to
New Zealand
 List